I Remember When I Was Young (subtitled Songs from The Great Australian Songbook) is an album by Australian vocalist John Farnham, released on 6 November 2005. It consists of cover versions of songs written or recorded by prominent Australian artists and bands from the 1970s through to the 1990s, including Daddy Cool, Mondo Rock, Cold Chisel, Men At Work, Renee Geyer, Australian Crawl, Richard Clapton, The Badloves, Leonardo's Bride and The Whitlams. The album's title track was written and performed by blues musician Matt Taylor of the band Chain.

Chart 
The album debuted on the ARIA charts at #2 and soon after its release it peaked at #1.
John Farnham performed "Downhearted" live on the Australian version of Dancing with the Stars.

Track listing

Personnel
John Farnham - vocals
Chong Lim - keyboards, arrangements
Lindsay Field - vocals
Lisa Edwards - vocals
Dannielle Gaha - vocals
Joe Creighton - double bass
Brett Garsed - guitars
Stuart Fraser - guitars
Angus Burchall - drums
Ian Cooper - violin

Charts

Weekly charts

Year-end charts

Certifications

References 

2005 albums
Covers albums
Gotham Records albums
John Farnham albums